Frank Caliendo Jr. (born January 19, 1974) is an American comedian, actor and impressionist, best known for his impersonations on the Fox Network television series MADtv, and as the in-house prognosticator for Fox NFL Sunday. In 2007 and 2008, he performed his impersonations on his own show, Frank TV, which aired on TBS. He is known for his impressions and for his frequent appearances on The Bob & Tom Show. He has released six solo CDs. From 2009 to 2011 he had a show at the Monte Carlo Resort and Casino in Las Vegas.

Early life and education
Caliendo was born in Chicago, Illinois and grew up in Waukesha, Wisconsin, where he attended Waukesha South High School. He is of Italian descent. Before graduating from University of Wisconsin–Milwaukee, Caliendo began performing stand-up comedy at local night clubs and comedy clubs, eventually taking a job as a master of ceremonies at a local comedy club. Within a few years, he was active on the college circuit. Between 2000 and 2001, Caliendo made his television debut on sketch comedy series Hype, later gaining exposure on the comedy series MADtv.

Career
Caliendo has performed stand-up on Premium Blend, Late Show with David Letterman, Late Late Show with Craig Kilborn, The View, The Late Late Show with Craig Ferguson, and Late Night with Conan O'Brien. He was featured in Comedy Central's animated series Shorties Watchin' Shorties in 2004.

His John Madden impression has appeared on Fox NFL Sunday, The Best Damn Sports Show Period and Mohr Sports. Caliendo has also appeared on Comedy Central's Comedy Central Presents, as well as the radio shows The Free Beer and Hot Wings Show, Randy Baumann and the DVE Morning Show, The Dan Le Batard Show, The Dan Patrick Show, The Junkies, Bob & Sheri, The Bob & Tom Show, Mike and Mike in the Morning, Opie and Anthony, The Detroit Cast, The Don and Mike Show, Rise Guys, Bubba the Love Sponge, The John Boy and Billy Big Show, The Howard Stern Show, Mike and the Mad Dog, Elliot in the Morning, The Sports Inferno, The Rick and Bubba Show, The Roe Conn Show, Pardon My Take, The 105.7 WAPL Rick and Len Show, Preston and Steve, Bob and Brian, The Glenn Beck Program, Holmberg's Morning Sickness on 98 KUPD in Phoenix, and Lamont & Tonelli on 107.7 The Bone in San Francisco. From 2001 to 2004, he also made appearances on the KQ Morning Show's annual "Live from Las Vegas" simulcast, appearing on the panel throughout the show and reprising a few bits from his stand-up act.

Fox NFL Sunday
On November 5, 2000, Caliendo appeared on Fox NFL Sunday; he returned again the same season on January 7 during the playoffs. In 2001 and 2002, Caliendo returned as a semi-regular guest. In 2003, Caliendo joined Fox NFL Sunday as a regular cast member, giving his predictions for the day's NFL games.

On August 2, 2012, Caliendo announced he would not be on Fox NFL Sunday for the 2012 season, and was replaced by Rob Riggle.

MADtv
Caliendo officially joined the cast of MADtv in 2001 as a repertory performer, for the seventh season. In 2002, Caliendo replaced Will Sasso as the impersonator of George W. Bush. Caliendo also did the announcing for the best of scenes on the MADtv season 1 DVD. Caliendo left MADtv  before the 2006–2007 season.

Frank TV

Caliendo starred on Frank TV, his own sketch show on the TBS that began airing in November 2007. Caliendo was its host and performed in sketches impersonating various celebrities.

In early 2008, TBS announced that they ordered eight more episodes, which ran later that year. The show ended after the fifteenth episode, which aired on December 23, 2008.

Other appearances
Caliendo's impression of President George W. Bush earned him an invitation to perform during the 2006 annual Radio-Television Correspondents Dinner.

Caliendo appeared in the 2007 film The Comebacks as "Chip Imitation" who impersonates John Madden and Al Michaels in the championship game.

During The Comedy Festival Caliendo hosted a special called The Comedy Festival Presents: Funniest Movies of the Year 2008 where, from Caesars Palace, Caliendo introduced the top ten list for funniest films of 2008 based on an Internet poll.

As of 2019, Caliendo is a recurring guest on the Barstool Sports podcast, Pardon My Take.

Personal life
Caliendo lives in Tempe, Arizona with his wife Michelle and their family.

Filmography

Discography
 Make the Voices Stop (2002)
 Frank on the Radio (2003)
 Frank on the Radio 2, Volume 1 (2007)
 Frank on the Radio 2, Volume 2 (2007)
 All Over the Place (2008)
 National Lampoon Live: Unleashed (2009)

Notes

External links

1974 births
Male actors from Chicago
Male actors from Milwaukee
American impressionists (entertainers)
American male film actors
American male television actors
American people of Italian descent
Living people
People from Waukesha, Wisconsin
University of Wisconsin–Milwaukee alumni
American sketch comedians
Comedians from Illinois
21st-century American comedians